The Sogdian Whirl dance or Sogdian Whirl (in Chinese huxuan wu) was a Sogdian dance imported in China in the first half of the  first millennium AD. The dance was imitated by the Chinese, and became extremely popular in China, where it went on to be performed at court.

History
The Sogdian Whirl and other similar, imported dances were extremely popular in China during the Tang Dynasty, especially in the area of Chang'an and Luoyang. 

The Sogdian merchant-dancers, who performed different dances but were especially renowned for this dance, were very famed in China. In the Sogdian Whirl, a young woman was spinning inside a circle. The Sogdian Whirl became enormously popular in China. It was performed both in the Chinese court and in China itself. Sources from the Tang dynasty attest to it being performed at court. The dance was performed at court by, among others, the Emperor Xuanzong of Tang and Yang Guifei, his favorite concubine.

The Sogdian Whirl was depicted in the funerary art of Sogdians in China. Further, it was depicted on many native Chinese tombs, which further shows its popularity in China.

Gallery

See also
 Sogdian art
 Iranians in China
 Tang China
 Huteng dance

References

Sogdians
Tang dynasty
Asian dances
Dances of China